The 1991–92 FIBA European League, also shortened to 1991–92 FIBA EuroLeague, was the 35th installment of the European top-tier level professional club competition for basketball clubs (now called EuroLeague). The competition's Final Four was held at the Abdi İpekçi Arena in Istanbul, Turkey. It was won by Partizan, who defeated Montigalà Joventut, by a result of 71–70.

This season of the competition also marked an end to the era of European national domestic league champions only participation, as it featured an expanded competition, that included national domestic league champions, the current league title holders, and some other teams from the most important national domestic leagues. That also was in accordance with the league being renamed, and being called the FIBA European League (or shortened to FIBA EuroLeague) championship for men's clubs. This was because the new competition format was closer to a true European League in style. It was a name the competition would keep for the next four editions of the competition as well.

Competition system 

 33 teams (the cup title holder, national domestic league champions, and a variable number of other clubs from the most important national domestic leagues) played knock-out rounds on a home and away basis. The aggregate score of both games decided the winner.
 The sixteen remaining teams after the knock-out rounds entered the Regular Season Group Stage, divided into two groups of eight teams, playing a round-robin. The final standing was based on individual wins and defeats. In the case of a tie between two or more teams after the group stage, the following criteria were used to decide the final classification: 1) number of wins in one-to-one games between the teams; 2) basket average between the teams; 3) general basket average within the group.
 The top four teams from each group after the Regular Season Group Stage qualified for a Quarterfinal Playoff (X-pairings, best of 3 games).
 The four winners of the Quarterfinal Playoff qualified for the Final Stage (Final Four), which was played at a predetermined venue.

First round 

|}

Second round 

|}
Automatically qualified to the group stage
  Slobodna Dalmacija (title holder)
  Montigalà Joventut
  Phonola Caserta
  Maccabi Elite Tel Aviv

Regular season 
The Regular Season begins on October 31.

If teams are level on record at the end of the Regular Season, tiebreakers are applied in the following order:
 Head-to-head record.
 Head-to-head point differential.
 Point differential during the Regular Season.
 Points scored during the regular season.
 Sum of quotients of points scored and points allowed in each Regular Season match.

 * Due to ongoing Yugoslav Wars, the three former Yugoslavian teams were forced to play all their home games outside their countries. All of them chose cities in Spain as the substitute home courts: eventual winner Partizan played in Fuenlabrada, title holder Slobodna Dalmacija in A Coruña and Cibona in Puerto Real.

Quarterfinals 
Seeded teams played games 2 and 3 at home.

|}

Final four

Semifinals 
April 14, Abdi İpekçi Arena, Istanbul

|}

3rd place game 
April 16, Abdi İpekçi Arena, Istanbul

|}

Final 
April 16, Abdi İpekçi Arena, Istanbul

|}

Final standings

Awards

1992 FIBA European League All-Final Four Team

References

External links 
 1991–92 FIBA European League
 1991–92 FIBA European League

 
EuroLeague seasons